The 1945 Yugoslav First Basketball League season was the inaugural season of the Yugoslav First Basketball League, the top-tier level basketball competition in Yugoslavia. The league launched with 5 teams playing a single-elimination tournament held in Subotica, PR Serbia. Teams participating in the season were selections of three Yugoslav constituent republics (PR Croatia, PR Macedonia, and PR Serbia), one autonomous province (AP Vojvodina), as well as the Yugoslav People's Army selection. The tournament concluded with the Yugoslav Army team defeating the Serbia team, 21–18, in the Final.

Bracket
Source

Rosters  
The following is a list of players and coached who played in the 1945 season.

See also 
 1945 Yugoslav Women's Basketball League

References

1945
1945 in Yugoslav basketball